Dornier may refer to:
 Claudius Dornier (1884–1969), German aircraft designer and builder
 Dornier Flugzeugwerke, German aircraft manufacturer founded in 1914 by Claudius Dornier 
 Dornier Consulting, international consulting and project management company 
 Fairchild-Dornier, in 1996, Fairchild took on this name, when it purchased Dornier's assets, see Fairchild Aircraft
 Lindauer Dornier, German textile machinery manufacturer
 Dornier Wines, a winery in South Africa

See also
 
 List of military aircraft of Germany by manufacturer#Dornier